Frank Burton may refer to:

Frank Burton (footballer, born 1865) (1865–1948), Notts County, Nottingham Forest and England footballer

Frank Burton (footballer, born 1890) (1890–1967), West Ham United and Charlton Athletic footballer
Frank Burton (Sheriff of Nottinghamshire), High Sheriff of Nottinghamshire in 1938
Frank W. Burton (1857–1934), American politician and judge
Frank Burton, character in Abduction (2011 film)

See also
Francis Burton (disambiguation)